Sir Joseph Henry Gilbert, Fellow of the Royal Society (1 August 1817 – 23 December 1901) was an English chemist, noteworthy for his long career spent improving the methods of practical agriculture. He was a fellow of the Royal Society.

Life

He was born at Hull, the son of Joseph Gilbert and Ann Gilbert. He studied chemistry first at Glasgow under Thomas Thomson; then at University College, London, in the laboratory of Anthony Todd Thomson (1778-1849), the professor of medical jurisprudence, also attending Thomas Graham's lectures; and finally at the University of Giessen under Liebig. On his return to England from Germany he acted for a year or so as assistant to his old master A. T. Thomson at University College, and in 1843, after spending a short time in the study of calico dyeing and printing near Manchester, accepted the directorship of the chemical laboratory at the agricultural experiment station established by John Bennet Lawes at Rothamsted, near St. Albans.

This position he held for fifty-eight years, until his death on 23 December 1901. The work which he carried out in collaboration with Lawes involved the application of chemistry, meteorology, botany, animal and vegetable physiology, and geology to the methods of practical agriculture.

Gilbert was chosen a fellow of the Royal Society in 1860, and in 1867 was awarded a Royal Medal jointly with Lawes. In 1880 he presided over the Chemical Section of the British Association at its meeting at Swansea, and in 1882 he was president of the London Chemical Society, of which he had been a member almost from its foundation in 1841. For six years from 1884 he filled the Sibthorpian chair of rural economy at Oxford, and he was also an honorary professor at the Royal Agricultural College, Cirencester. He was knighted on 11 August 1893, the year in which the jubilee of the Rothamsted experiments was celebrated.

References

Antonio Saltini, Storia delle scienze agrarie, vol. IV, L'agricoltura al tornante della scoperta dei microbi, Edagricole, Bologna 1989, 413-458

External links

 Biographical Database of the British Chemical Community: Joseph Henry Gilbert
 Royal Society citation
 National Portrait Gallery
 Rothamsted Archive Catalogue
 Correspondence of John Bennet Lawes and Joseph Henry Gilbert 1846 to 1900

1817 births
1901 deaths
Alumni of University College London
Academics of the Royal Agricultural University
19th-century British chemists
Fellows of the Royal Society
Royal Medal winners